Vice President for Executive Affairs is a government position in Iran whose officeholder acts as a Vice President of Iran. 

As existence of this office is not obligatory by law, the responsibilities and authorities vested in this position could vary depending on the delegation given by the president.

List of officeholders

References 

Vice presidents of Iran